Sundance Provincial Park is a provincial park located in western Alberta, Canada, 100 km east of Jasper National Park.
The park is accessed via Emerson Creek Road, running north of Edson and Hinton, roughly parallel to the Yellowhead Highway.

The two parks
The park has two distinct parts.  The first, surrounding the five Emerson lakes and bordering the Athabasca River, has camping, fishing, and a number of small trails circling the lakes.  The second section, much larger, protects a series of hoodoos carved into the sandstone cliffs of the foothill valley, surrounding Sundance Creek and Sundance Lake.  The "Wild Sculpture Trail" is located in this section of the park. The two parks have a total surface of 37 km², and an additional 42 km² "Special Management Zone" buffer surrounds the two areas.

See also
List of provincial parks in Alberta
List of Canadian provincial parks
List of National Parks of Canada

External links
Alberta Parks - Sundance Provincial park information

Provincial parks of Alberta
Yellowhead County